Piedmont is a region of Northwest Italy, one of the 20 regions of the country. It borders the Liguria region to the south, the Lombardy and Emilia-Romagna regions to the east and the Aosta Valley region to the northwest; it also borders Switzerland to the northeast and France to the west. It has an area of  making it the second largest region of Italy after Sicily and a population of 4,269,714 as of 31 January 2021. The capital of Piedmont is Turin.

Toponymy

Geography 

Piedmont is surrounded on three sides by the Alps, including Monviso, where the river Po rises, and Monte Rosa. It borders with France (Auvergne-Rhône-Alpes and Provence-Alpes-Côte d'Azur), Switzerland (Ticino and Valais) and the Italian regions of Lombardy, Liguria, Aosta Valley and for a very small part with Emilia Romagna. The geography of Piedmont is 43.3% mountainous, along with extensive areas of hills (30.3%) and plains (26.4%).

Piedmont is the second largest of Italy's 20 regions, after Sicily. It is broadly coincident with the upper part of the drainage basin of the river Po, which rises from the slopes of Monviso in the west of the region and is Italy's largest river. The Po drains the semicircle formed by the Alps and Apennines, which surround the region on three sides.

The countryside is very diverse: from the rugged peaks of the massifs of Monte Rosa and Gran Paradiso to the damp rice paddies of Vercelli and Novara, from the gentle hillsides of the Langhe, Roero and Montferrat to the plains. 7.6% of the entire territory is considered protected area. There are 56 different national or regional parks; one of the most famous is the Gran Paradiso National Park, between Piedmont and the Aosta Valley.

Piedmont has a typically temperate climate, which on the Alps becomes progressively temperate-cold and colder as it climbs to altitude. In areas located at low altitudes, winters are relatively cold but not very rainy and often sunny, with the possibility of snowfall, sometimes abundant. Snowfall, on the other hand, is less frequent and occasional in the northeast areas. Summers are hot with local possibilities of strong thunderstorms.

Major towns and cities 

Other towns of Piedmont with more than 20,000 inhabitants sorted by population :

History 

Piedmont was inhabited in early historic times by Celtic-Ligurian tribes such as the Taurini and the Salassi. They were later subdued by the Romans (c. 220 BC), who founded several colonies there including Augusta Taurinorum (Turin) and Eporedia (Ivrea). After the fall of the Western Roman Empire, the region was successively invaded by the Burgundians, the Ostrogoths (5th century), East Romans, Lombards (6th century), and Franks (773).

In the 9th–10th centuries there were further incursions by the Magyars, Saracens and Muslim Moors. At the time Piedmont, as part of the Kingdom of Italy within the Holy Roman Empire, was subdivided into several marches and counties.

In 1046, Otto of Savoy added Piedmont to the County of Savoy, with a capital at Chambéry (now in France). Other areas remained independent, such as the powerful comuni (municipalities) of Asti and Alessandria and the marquisates of Saluzzo and Montferrat. The County of Savoy became the Duchy of Savoy in 1416, and Duke Emanuele Filiberto moved the seat to Turin in 1563. In 1720, the Duke of Savoy became King of Sardinia, founding what evolved into the Kingdom of Sardinia and increasing Turin's importance as a European capital.

The Republic of Alba was created in 1796 as a French client republic in Piedmont. A new client republic, the Piedmontese Republic, existed between 1798 and 1799 before it was reoccupied by Austrian and Russian troops. In June 1800 a third client republic, the Subalpine Republic, was established in Piedmont. It fell under full French control in 1801 and it was annexed by France in September 1802. In the Congress of Vienna, the Kingdom of Sardinia was restored and furthermore received the Republic of Genoa to strengthen it as a barrier against France.

Piedmont was a springboard for Italian unification in 1859–1861, following earlier unsuccessful wars against the Austrian Empire in 1820–1821 and 1848–1849. This process is sometimes referred to as Piedmontisation. However, the efforts were later countered by the efforts of rural farmers.

The House of Savoy became Kings of Italy, and Turin briefly became the capital of Italy. However, when the Italian capital was moved to Florence, and then to Rome, the administrative and institutional importance of Piedmont was reduced. The only recognition of Piedmont's historical role was that the crown prince of Italy was known as the Prince of Piedmont. After Italian unification, Piedmont was one of the most important regions in the first Italian industrialization.

Economy 

The gross domestic product (GDP) of the region was 137.4 billion euros in 2018, accounting for 7.8% of Italy's GDP. GDP per capita at purchasing power parity was 31,300 euros or 104% of the EU27 average in the same year. The GDP per employee was 111% of the EU average.

Since 2006 the Piemonte Agency for Investments, Export and Tourism began to facilitate outside investment and promote Piedmont's industry and tourism. It was the first Italian institution to combine the activities being carried out by pre-existing local organizations to promote the territory internationally.

Automotive 

The region contains major industrial centres, the most important of which is Turin, home to the FIAT conglomerate, but mass-market FIAT cars are not produced anymore, only small-scale manufacturing of luxury Maserati cars (36,702 in 2020).  Most of the ex-FIAT plants now belong to other companies: aerospace is owned by Leonardo S.p.A., turbo jet engines by General Electric, high-speed trains by Alstom, bearings by SKF. FIAT does not exist anymore as an independent company, car production belongs to Stellantis, and trucks, buses, tractors, agriculture and construction machines are produced by the independent company CNH Industrial (most manufacturing activity takes place in the United States, in Piedmont only the production of New Holland excavators in San Mauro Torinese and IVECO diesel engines in Turin). Neither of them are headquartered in Turin anymore, however, some research and development centres are still working. 

Formerly famous automotive design companies also were sold to global automotive groups: Italdesign Giugiaro to Volkswagen, Ghia to Ford, Pininfarina to Mahindra; Bertone goes into bankruptcy in 2014. Massive decline in automotive industry caused that other regions like Veneto  (€163 billion in 2018) and Emilia-Romagna (€161 billion in 2018) surpassed Piedmont (€137 billion in 2018) in GDP and relative high unemployment. The peak of Italian motor vehicle production is reached in 1989 with 2.22 million units, but in 2019 (before COVID pandemic) it was only 0.92 million units. Even existing Italian car production now relocated to South Italy: Pomigliano d'Arco (140,478 in 2020), Melfi (229,848 in 2020), Atessa (257,026 in 2020) because of cost cutting. 

There are some automotive suppliers of:  
 exhaust systems, electronic systems, suspension systems and automotive lighting in Venaria Reale and Rivalta di Torino from Magneti Marelli
 dual-clutch transmission, gearboxes, drivelines and their mechatronics components from Dana Graziano 
 bearings from SKF
 tires (Michelin and Pirelli)

Electronics and Industrial Equipment 
There are some important companies in high-tech manufacturing: Comau (industrial robots) and Prima Industrie (laser equipment). Silicon wafer production is in Novara by MEMC. Olivetti, once a major electronics industry whose plants were in Scarmagno and Ivrea, has now turned into a small-scale computer service company and no longer produces computers. Leonardo Elettronica in Turin-Caselle develops and manufactures airborne mission systems and airborne computers.

Machine building has a long tradition in Piedmont with the manufacturing of excavators, telescopic handlers, industrial refrigerators, printing machines, paper machines, packaging machines, glass machines, turbines, and high-speed trains.

Aerospace and Defence 
Actually one of the most important industries in Piedmont is military aerospace with plants:

 Leonardo Aircraft Turin-Caselle (Nord and Sud), final assembly of multi-role attack jet Eurofighter Typhoon, ground-attack jet AMX and military transport aircraft C-27J Spartan

 Leonardo Aircraft Novara-Cameri, final assembly of stealth multi-role attack jet Lockheed Martin F-35

 General Electric Avio Aero in Rivalta di Torino, Turin-Sangone, Borgaretto, manufacturing of mechanical transmissions for gas turbine, foundry

 Avio in Turin, final assembly of rocket Vega

Wool Textile
Italy is still the world largest exporter of carded (71.8% in 2018) and combed (73.4% in 2018) wool fabrics. These are the only two types of fabrics not dominated by Chinese textile exports. There are three industrial districts that process wool in Italy. One of them, Biella, is located in Piedmont. 

Some basic stages of wool processing (not complete):

Jewellery
One of Italy's four industrial jewellery districts is located in Valenza. Large jewellery companies such as Damiani, Bulgari, and Cartier have factories here as do many other smaller companies.

Food
Since 2006, the Piedmont region has benefited from the start of the Slow Food movement and Terra Madre, events that highlighted the rich agricultural and viticultural value of the Po valley and northern Italy. A chain of food halls Eataly works in collaboration with Slow Food. Piedmont is the leading producer of confectionery, coffee, rice, and white truffles in Italy. It is ranked 3 of 20 for the production of quality DOC and DOCG wines with 1,982,718 hl, there are 17 DOCG wines of all possible types (white, red, sweet, sparkling). In 2019, Piedmont accounted for 16.5% of wine exports from Italy, ranking second behind Veneto, with 36%. The typical food industries in Piedmont are:
 alcoholic beverages
 production of quality dry red wines from Nebbiolo, Barbera and Dolcetto grapes
 production of quality dry white wines 
 production of sweet white wines from Dolcetto and Erbaluce grapes
 production of vermouth, which was invented in Piedmont
 production of sparkling wine Asti Spumante, Alta Langa, Gavi
 coffee
 production of coffee Lavazza
 production of coffee/chocolate liqueur Bicherin 
 confectionery
 production of traditional Chocolate Gianduiotto
 production of different kind of chocolate and pralines
 production of torrone
 production of sweet paste Nutella
 production of biscotto
 delicacy
 production of white truffles from Alba and related products with white truffles like condiments, honey, salami, and prosciutto
 production of high-quality marinated beef Gradisca or dried beef Bresaola
 cereals
 production of dry risotto mixes

Unemployment 
The unemployment rate stood at 7.5% in 2020.

Agriculture

Lowland Piedmont is a fertile agricultural region. The main agricultural products in Piedmont are cereals, including rice, representing more than 10% of national production, maize, grapes for wine-making, fruit and milk. With more than 800,000 head of cattle in 2000, livestock production accounts for half of total agricultural production in Piedmont.

Piedmont is one of the great winegrowing regions in Italy. More than half of its  of vineyards are registered with DOC designations. It produces prestigious wines as Barolo and Barbaresco from the Langhe near Alba, and the Moscato d'Asti and sparkling Asti from the vineyards around Asti. Indigenous grape varieties include Nebbiolo, Barbera, Dolcetto, Freisa, Grignolino and Brachetto.

Tourism

Tourism in Piedmont employs 75,534 people and involves 17,367 companies operating in the hospitality and catering sector, with 1,473 hotels and other tourist accommodation. The sector generates a turnover of €2,671 million, 3.3% of the €80,196 million total estimated spending on tourism in Italy. The region is popular with both foreign visitors and those from other parts of Italy. In 2002 there were 2,651,068 total arrivals, 1,124,696 (42%) of whom were foreign. The traditional leading areas for tourism in Piedmont are the Lake District ("Piedmont's riviera"), which accounts for 32.84% of total overnight stays, and the metropolitan area of Turin, which accounts for 26.51%.

In 2006, Turin hosted the XX Olympic Winter Games and in 2007 it hosted the XXIII Universiade. Alpine tourism tends to concentrate in a few highly developed stations like Alagna Valsesia and Sestriere. Around 1980, the long-distance trail Grande Traversata delle Alpi (GTA) was created to draw more attention to the variety of remote, sparsely inhabited valleys.

Within the tourism industry in Piedmont, a reference to the system of Royal Residences has to be made. First of all, it is part of the UNESCO World Heritage Sites since 1997 and, secondly, it represents a peculiarity of the region, since such a network cannot be found elsewhere in Italy. The Residences of the Royal House of Savoy belong to the historical and cultural heritage of Piedmont and nowadays they play a central role in the tourism field. In a reality in which the tourism industry is characterized by an amalgam of several players and stakeholders, the creation of a system or network like the one of the Royal Residences represents an added benefit for the whole territory as well as a competitive edge. Therefore, considering that tourism is a key factor in the creation of long-lasting value and working in a cooperative and collaborative perspective is essential, the network of the Royal Residences represents an example worth of notice.

Transport

Land 
There are links with neighbouring France via the Fréjus and Colle di Tenda tunnels as well as the Montgenèvre Pass. Piedmont also connects with Switzerland by the Simplon and Great St Bernard passes. It is possible to reach Switzerland via a normal road that crosses eastern Piedmont, starting from Arona and ending in Locarno, on the Swiss border.  The region has the longest motorway network amongst the Italian regions (about 800 km). It radiates from Turin, connecting it with the other provinces in the region, as well as with the other regions in Italy. In 2001, the number of passenger cars per 1,000 inhabitants was 623 (above the national average of 575).

There is a Turin–Milan high-speed railway, travel time is only 52 minutes.

Air 
Turin-Caselle International Airport has domestic and international flights and handle 3,952,158 passengers and 3,334 tons of cargo in 2019 (before COVID-19 pandemic).

Education 

The economy of Piedmont is anchored on a rich history of state support for higher education, including some of the leading universities in Italy. Piedmont is home to the famous University of Turin, the Polytechnic University of Turin, the University of Eastern Piedmont and, more recently the United Nations Interregional Crime and Justice Research Institute.

Demographics 

The population density in Piedmont is lower than the national average. In 2008 it was equal to 174 inhabitants per km2, compared to a national figure of about 200. The Metropolitan City of Turin has 335 inhabitants per km2, whereas Verbano-Cusio-Ossola is the least densely populated province, with 72 inhabitants per km2.

The population of Piedmont followed a downward trend throughout the 1980s, a result of the natural negative balance (of some 3 to 4% per year), while the migratory balance since 1986 has again become positive because of immigration. The population remained stable in the 1990s.

The Turin metro area grew rapidly in the 1950s and 1960s due to an increase of immigrants from southern Italy and Veneto and today it has a population of approximately two million. , the Italian national institute of statistics (ISTAT) estimated that 310,543 foreign-born immigrants live in Piedmont, equal to 7.0% of the total regional population. Most immigrants come from Eastern Europe (mostly from Romania, Albania, and Ukraine) with smaller communities of African immigrants.

Government and politics 

The Regional Government (Giunta Regionale) is presided by the President of the Region (Presidente della Regione), who is elected for a five-year term and is composed by the President and the Ministers, who are currently 14, including a Vice President (Vice Presidente). In the last regional election, which took place on 29–30 March 2010, Roberto Cota (Lega Nord) defeated incumbent Mercedes Bresso (Democratic Party). In 2014 Cota chose not to stand again for president and the parties composing his coalition failed to agree on a single candidate, resulting in a landslide victory for Sergio Chiamparino, a Democrat who had been Mayor of Turin from 2001 to 2011. Sergio Chiamparino has been in charge between 2014 and 2019, when Alberto Cirio (Forza Italia) became the new President of the Region.

Administrative divisions 
Piedmont is divided into eight provinces:

Culture

Languages
As in the rest of Italy, Italian is the official national language. The main local languages are Piedmontese, Insubric (spoken in the eastern part of the region), Occitan (spoken by a minority in the Occitan Valleys situated in the Province of Cuneo and the Metropolitan City of Turin), and Franco-Provençal (spoken by another minority in the alpine heights of the Metropolitan City of Turin), like in the Susa valley and Walser (spoken by a minority in the Province of Vercelli and Province of Verbano-Cusio-Ossola).

Sport

Turin hosted the 2006 Winter Olympics.

In football, notable clubs in Piedmont include Turin-based Juventus and Torino, who have won 43 official top-flight league championships (as of the 2020-21 season) between them (36 titles won by Juventus and seven by Torino), more than any other city in Italy. Juventus is the most successful club in Italy, having won the most league titles (36), Coppa Italia titles (14) and Suppercoppa Italiana titles (9) of any team in the country. Other smaller teams include the old "Piedmont Quadrilateral" components Novara, Alessandria, Casale, Pro Vercelli. With the pre-World War II success of Pro Vercelli in 1910s and Juventus in 1930s, as well as winning cycles of Torino during the Grande Torino years and Juventus in different eras since 1950, the region became the most successful in terms of championships won. Also Casale and Novese contributed with one scudetto each.

Other local teams include volleyball teams Cuneo (male) and AGIL Novara (female), basketball teams Biella Basketball and Junior Casale, ice hockey team Hockey Club Turin, and roller hockey side Amatori Vercelli, who have won three league titles, an Italian Cup and two CERS Cups.

See also

Citations

General sources 
 Collier, M. (2003). Italian Unification, 1820–71. Heinemann: Oxford. .

External links 

 Regional government website 
 

 
NUTS 2 statistical regions of the European Union
Regions of Italy